Zherdevo is a rural locality in Polyansky Selsoviet Rural Settlement, Kursky District, Kursk Oblast, Russia. Population:

Geography 
The village is located 83 km from the Russia–Ukraine border, 19 km north-west of Kursk, 6 km from the selsoviet center – Polyanskoye.

 Climate
Zherdevo has a warm-summer humid continental climate (Dfb in the Köppen climate classification).

Transport 
Zherdevo is located 13 km from the federal route  Crimea Highway (a part of the European route ), 2 km from the road of intermunicipal significance  (M2 "Crimea Highway" – Polyanskoye – border of the Oktyabrsky District), 4 km from the road  (38N-197 – 2nd Anpilogovo – Bolshoye Lukino), 16 km from the nearest railway station Dyakonovo (railway line Lgov I — Kursk).

The rural locality is situated 25 km from Kursk Vostochny Airport, 135 km from Belgorod International Airport and 228 km from Voronezh Peter the Great Airport.

References

Notes

Sources

Rural localities in Kursky District, Kursk Oblast